Marcello is a common masculine Italian given name. It is a variant of Marcellus. The Spanish and Portuguese version of the name is Marcelo, differing in having only one "l", while the Greek form is Markellos.

Etymology 

The name originally means like a hammer.
It is originally the adjectival form of Marcus,  which means hammer; the -el suffix was in times of archaic Latin the adjectival form.

People with given name
 Marcello Abbado (1926–2020), Italian pianist
 Marcello Boldrini (1890–1969), Italian statistician
 Marcello Borges (born 1997), American soccer player
 Marcello Caetano (1906–1980), Portuguese politician
 Marcello Campolonghi (born 1975), Italian footballer
 Marcello Castellini (born 1973), Italian footballer
 Marcello Cerruti (1808–1896), Italian diplomat and politician
 Marcello Ciorciolini (1922–2011), Italian director and screenwriter
 Marcello Dudovich (1878–1962), Italian painter and illustrator
 Marcello Fabbri (1923–2015), Italian poet
 Marcello Falzerano (born 1991), Italian footballer
 Marcello Fois (born 1960), Italian writer
 Marcello Gandini (born 1938), Italian car designer
 Marcello Giordani (1963–2019), Italian opera singer
 Marcello Lippi (born 1948), Italian football manager
 Marcello Malpighi (1628–1694), Italian biologist and physician
 Marcello Mastrilli (1603–1637), Italian Jesuit missionary
 Marcello Mastroianni (1924–1996), Italian actor
 Marcello Minenna, Italian economist
 Marcello Musto (born 1976), Canadian political scientist
 Marcello Pacifico (born 1977), Italian trade unionist
 Marcello Pera (born 1943), Italian philosopher and politician
 Marcello Planca, Italian Roman Catholic bishop
 Marcello Possenti (born 1992), Italian footballer
 Marcello D. Rapp, bass guitarist for American alternative rock band Against All Will
 Marcello Siniscalco (1924–2013), Italian scientist
 Marcello Spatafora (born 1941), Italian diplomat
 Marcello Stefanini (1938–1994), Italian politician
 Marcello Thedford, American actor
 Marcello Trotta (born 1992), Italian footballer
 Marcello Varallo (born 1947), Italian alpine skier
 Marcello Veneziale (born 1941), Italian magistrate and politician
 Marcello Venusti (1512–1579), Italian painter
 Marcello Violi (born 1993), Italian rugby union player

People with surname

In music 

 Alessandro Marcello, Italian nobleman and dilettante who dabbled in various areas, especially music
 Benedetto Marcello, brother of Alessandro, Italian composer, writer, advocate, magistrate, and teacher
Rosanna Scalfi Marcello, composer, singer, and wife of Benedetto Marcello
 Kee Marcello, former guitarist in the Swedish hard rock band Europe
 Rob Marcello, the current guitarist of the band Danger Danger

Other fields 

 Carlos Marcello, Italian-American mobster
 Marcello, pseudonym used by Swiss sculptor and painter Adèle d'Affry

See also
 San Marcello (disambiguation)
 Marcello class submarine, a class of Italian submarines

Italian-language surnames
Italian masculine given names
Surnames from given names
cs:Marcel
de:Marcellus (Name)
la:Marcellus
hu:Marcell
nl:Marcel
ja:マルケッルス
pl:Marceli
ru:Маркел
sk:Marcel
sl:Marcel
sr:Марцел